Seven Steps: The Complete Columbia Recordings of Miles Davis 1963–1964 is a box set of studio and concert recordings by Miles Davis for Columbia over a two-year period. Instead of focusing on a particular collaboration or session period, it focuses on the time period in between the solidified lineups of the first and second Great Quintets, starting with Ron Carter's introduction and finishing with the establishment of Wayne Shorter in the lineup.

Albums 
The third chronologically in the series of Miles Davis box sets issued by Columbia, the set includes material from the albums:

 Seven Steps to Heaven (1963) 
 Quiet Nights (1963) (One track only)
 Miles Davis in Europe (1964) 
 My Funny Valentine (1965) 
 Four & More (1966)
 Miles in Tokyo (1969)
 Miles in Berlin (1965)

Track list

Disc One

 Track 1 incorrectly indexed as "Album Version", the master take of the song can be found on Disc 2
 Track 4 incorrectly indexed as "Album Version", however it is available as a Bonus Track on the 2005 reissue of "Seven Steps to Heaven"
 Track 8 also found as a Bonus Track on the 2005 reissue of "Seven Steps to Heaven"

Disc Two

Disc Three

Tracks 4 and 5 are the final numbers from the concert In Europe was recorded on. Both were left off of previous and future reissues due to CD limitations.

Disc Four

Disc Five

All tracks from Discs Four and Five come from the same recording at Philharmonic Hall, which would be split into the slow tracks on My Funny Valentine and the fast tracks on 'Four' and More.

Disc Six

Disc Seven

Personnel 

 Miles Davis – Trumpet
 George Coleman - Tenor Saxophone (Discs 1-5)
 Sam Rivers - Tenor Saxophone (Disc 6)
 Wayne Shorter - Tenor Saxophone (Disc 7)
 Victor Feldman – Piano (Disc 1)
 Herbie Hancock - Piano (Discs 2-7)
Ron Carter – Double Bass
 Frank Butler – Drums (Disc 1)
 Tony Williams - Drums (Discs 2-7)

References

Miles Davis compilation albums
2004 compilation albums
Albums recorded at CBS 30th Street Studio